Martha Alicia Villarreal Esparza (born August 31, 1971), known simply and professionally as Alicia Villarreal, is a Mexican singer-songwriter.

Villarreal participated in different bands in Monterrey, before becoming the lead singer for Grupo Límite in 1995. After nearly eight years of success, Villarreal left the band pursuing a solo career. Villarreal released her first solo album, entitled Soy Lo Prohibido, in 2001.

Villarreal's work has garnered a Grammy nomination and two Latin Grammy Awards, one from her time with Grupo Límite and one as a solo artist.

Biography
Villarreal first performed the song Mundo De Juguetes at Pipo, a local TV show her parents took her to. Her first professional performance was at a church fundraiser.

In 1995, Grupo Límite, with her as lead singer, started touring with the more famous Grupo Bronco.  Among their songs were "Acariciame", "Te Aprovechas" and "Solo Contigo". Grupo Limite released six albums altogether, including a live CD recorded in Mexico City.

In 2001, Villarreal released her first solo album in the ranchera style titled Soy Lo Prohibido, which featured the hit single Te Quedo Grande la Yegua. After the success of the album, Villarreal stated she felt conflicted on how to proceed with her career due to changing genres.

In 2004, after parting ways with her bandmates, she released her second solo album entitled Cuando el Corazón se Cruza. The album was produced by her current husband, Cruz Martínez, and they wrote several of the songs together. The album has garnered her several awards

in 2006, Villarreal performed for the highly televised Selena Vive, where she performed Si Una Vez. She later released this song along with 2 other new songs Punalada Trapera and Ya No Hay Amor on a dual disc of the album Cuando El Corazón Se Cruza. The dual disc also contained 5 remixes to her previous songs and a collection of all her music videos. The dual disc was released in Mexico in 2005.

In 2006, she released her third solo album titled Orgullo De Mujer with the lead single Insensible a Ti. The single was the theme song for the telenovela Duelo de Pasiones, on which she made her acting debut, in the role of Raquel. Orgullo de Mujer garnered a Grammy nomination for Best Mexican/Mexican-American Album.

After nearly a four-year hiatus, Villarreal announced she was in the studio recording her 4th solo album.  The entitled La Jefa was released June 23, 2009, with "Caso Perdido," as lead single.  The album debuted at number one on Billboards Regional Mexican Albums and overall at number four on its Latin Albums chart.  La Jefa received mixed reviews upon its release.

Nearly eight years from taking time to raise her children, Villarreal released her fifth studio album, La Villarreal on September 8, 2017.

Personal life

Alicia Villarreal married her first husband, record producer Ezequiel Cuevas in 1991; they divorced in 1993.

She married Arturo Carmona on December 16, 1998. They had a daughter, Melenie Carmona Villarreal, on April 10, 1999. They divorced in 2001.

She is married to Cruz Martínez, owner/producer of Los Super Reyes, on August 31, 2003. They have two sons, Cruz Angelo Martinez (born December 19, 2005) and Felix Estefano Martinez (born February 12, 2007).

On October 10, 2009, her brother José Víctor Villarreal Esparza, who was 36 years old, died in a car accident in Monterrey, Nuevo León, Mexico.

Discography

Studio albums

References

External links

 Official MySpace
 Official Facebook
 Official YouTube

1971 births
Cruz Martínez
Mexican women singers
Latin Grammy Award winners
Living people
Mexican women singer-songwriters
Mexican singer-songwriters
Singers from Monterrey
Latin music songwriters
Women in Latin music